The Kwasa Damansara station is a mass rapid transit (MRT) station that serves the future township of Kwasa Damansara in Selangor, Malaysia, which is currently being developed. It is the first station of both the MRT Kajang Line and MRT Putrajaya Line.

The ceremony to launch Phase One of the Kajang line by the Prime Minister of Malaysia Najib Razak was held at this station on 15 December 2016 and the station was officially opened on 16 December 2016. The station later became an interchange station between the MRT Kajang Line and the MRT Putrajaya Line which opened to the public on 16 June 2022. Both lines currently terminate at this station.

Station features

Station location
The station is located within the Kwasa Damansara development project, one of two stations to serve this future township. As it is located away from Jalan Sungai Buloh (Malay; English: Sungai Buloh Road), a new access road was built to give access to the station.

Although the tracks at the Kwasa Damansara station are elevated, the station building itself is at-grade, the only one of its kind on the MRT Sungai Buloh-Kajang Line, but similar to Setiawangsa station on the Kelana Jaya Line.

The station has three levels, with the ground floor being the concourse and the two floors above being platform levels. The two elevated platforms are island platforms, enabling this station to have four platforms to enable it to function as the interchange station between the MRT Kajang Line and MRT Putrajaya Line.

Platform 1 is dedicated for Kajang-bound trains of the MRT Kajang Line. This platform is on level 2. On the same level is platform 4, which is used as the terminus of MRT Putrajaya Line. On level 1, platform 2 functions as the terminus for MRT Kajang Line. Platform 3, across from platform 2, is for Putrajaya Sentral-bound trains for the MRT Putrajaya Line, although trains currently only stop at Kampung Batu station as it is the terminal station for the Phase 1 of MRT Putrajaya Line.

History
At the early stages of the project before the finalisation of station names, the Kwasa Damansara MRT station was referred to by the working name of Kota Damansara MRT Station. The name Kota Damansara initially caused some confusion; as there was another station named Kota Damansara two stations down. This station would eventually be given the name Kwasa Damansara MRT Station.

Station layout

Exits and entrances
The station currently has one entrance - Entrance A - although the design caters to future entrances when the area surrounding the station is developed. The entrance currently leads to the station access road and the park and ride facility.

Putrajaya Line
When Phase One operations for the MRT Putrajaya Line began on June 16, 2022, this station became the northern terminus of the line. At the same time, this station replaced Sungai Buloh station as the northern terminus of the MRT Kajang Line.

As a result, the Kampung Selamat station and Sungai Buloh station which were formerly a part of the MRT Kajang Line were transferred to the MRT Putrajaya Line.

Gallery

See also
 Putra Heights LRT station, similar cross-platform concept

References

External links

 Kwasa Damansara MRT station - MRT Website
 Klang Valley Mass Rapid Transit

Rapid transit stations in Selangor
Sungai Buloh-Kajang Line
Railway stations opened in 2016